The Deerslayer is an 1841 novel by James Fenimore Cooper (1789–1851).

The Deerslayer may also refer to:

 The Deerslayer and Chingachgook, a 1920 German film based on Cooper's novel
 Deerslayer (1943 film), an American film based on Cooper's novel
 The Deerslayer (1957 film), an American film based on Cooper's novel
 The Deerslayer (1978 film), a made-for-TV movie directed by Dick Friedenberg
 , a 1990 Soviet film based on Cooper's novel